Rodrigo Leal (born 31 October 1966) is a Guatemalan former swimmer who competed in the 1984 Summer Olympics.

References

1966 births
Living people
Guatemalan male freestyle swimmers
Olympic swimmers of Guatemala
Swimmers at the 1984 Summer Olympics
Place of birth missing (living people)